The Maltese donkey also known as Hmar Malti is a breed of donkey originated in Malta. It used to be used as a beast of burden. The breed was introduced into the United States, and helped contribute to the American mammoth donkey breed. The Maltese Donkey was also introduced to Australia during the mid 1800s. Currently, there are only about 50 Maltese donkeys remaining.

References

Donkey breeds